Robert Bruce Horsfall (October 21, 1869 – March 24, 1948) was an American wildlife illustrator. His paintings were included in several works from the early 20th century, including Frank M. Chapman's Warblers of North America.

Biography
Horsfall was born in Clinton, Iowa in 1869 to John Tomlin and Anne Buttersby Horsfall. He studied at the Cincinnati Art Academy and later at art schools in Munich and Paris. He married Carra Elisabeth Hunting in 1906 and had two sons (one adopted). His works have been exhibited in the Peabody Museum of Natural History at Yale University and Guyot Hall at Princeton University. He died on March 24, 1948, in Long Branch, New Jersey.

Publications
 American Land Birds by Alice E. Ball ; illustrated by Robert Bruce Horsfall. New York : Tudor, 1936. 
 Bird and Animal Paintings by R. Bruce Horsfall; text by Carra E. Horsfall. Washington, D.C., Nature magazine, 1930
 Birds of California: an introduction to more than 300 common birds of the state and adjacent islands, with a supplementary list of rare migrants, accidental visitants, and hypothetical subspecies by Irene Grosvenor Wheelock; with 10 full-page plates and 78 drawings in the text by Bruce Horsfall. Chicago : A.C. McClurg, 1904, 1912. 
 Birds of North Carolina, by Thomas Gilbert Pearson, Clement Samuel Brimley and Herbert Hutchinson Brimley, illustrations by Rex Brasher, Robert Bruce Horsfall, and Roger Tory Peterson. North Carolina Department of Agriculture, State Museum Division. Raleigh, Bynum Printing Company, 1942. 
 Birds of the Pacific Coast, by Willard Ayres Eliot, including a brief account of the distribution and habitat of 118 birds that are more or less common to the Pacific Coast states and British Columbia w/ 56 color plates by R. Bruce Horsfall. New York : G.P. Putnum's Sons, 1923
 Familiar Birds of the Northwest: Covering Birds Commonly Found in Oregon, Washington, Idaho, Northern California, and Western Canada by Harry B. Nehls ; with paintings by R. Bruce Horsfall et al.. Portland, Or. : Portland Audubon Society, 1981. 
 A Year with the Birds by Alice E. Ball; illustrated by Robert Bruce Horsfall. New York: Gibbs & Van Vleck, 1916, 1917. Each page is a poem by Ball accompanied by an illustration by Horsfall.
 Songs of the Open; words and music by Grace Keir with illustrations by Robert Bruce Horsfall : Carl Fischer, Inc. New York 1927.

References

External links
 
 

1869 births
1948 deaths
American bird artists
19th-century American painters
American male painters
20th-century American painters
19th-century American male artists
20th-century American male artists